Cairate is a comune (municipality) in the Province of Varese in the Italian region Lombardy, located about  northwest of Milan and about  south of Varese.

Cairate borders the following municipalities: Carnago, Cassano Magnago, Castelseprio, Fagnano Olona, Locate Varesino, Lonate Ceppino, Tradate.

References

External links
 Official website

Cities and towns in Lombardy